Striatosphaeria is a genus of fungi within the Chaetosphaeriaceae family. This is a monotypic genus, containing the single species Striatosphaeria codinaeaphora.

References

External links
Striatosphaeria at Index Fungorum

Chaetosphaeriales
Monotypic Sordariomycetes genera